Angelos Simiriotis (Dikili, 1870 – 1944) was a Greek poet, playwright, translator and educator.

References

Sources 
Yanis Kordatos, Ιστορία της νεοελληνικής λογοτεχνίας, vol. 2, ed. Επικαιρότητα, Athens, 1983
Tellos Agras, "Angelos Simiriotis", Νέα Εστία, vol. 18 τ.χ.211, (1 October 1935), p. 894-901
Dimitrios Tsakonas, Λογοτεχνία και κοινωνία στο μεσοπόλεμο, ed. Κάκτος, Athens, 1987, p. 186-188
ΕΚΕΒΙ

Anatolian Greeks
Modern Greek poets
Greek dramatists and playwrights
1870 births
1944 deaths
People from Dikili